Burçin is a Turkish given name. Notable persons with that name include:

Burçin Neziroğlu (born 1993), Turkish rhythmic gymnast
Burçin Terzioğlu (born 1980), Turkish actress
Burçin Mutlu-Pakdil, Turkish astrophysicist
, Turkish actress
Burçin Hatun, fictional character in Turkish TV series Kuruluş: Osman

See also
 Burcin
 Ivan Burtchin, Bulgarian sprint canoer

Turkish given names